Gurdwara Bal Lila Maini Sangat in a narrow lane close to Takht Sri Harmandir Sahib marks the house where King Fateh Chand Maini lived. His childless Queen had developed special fondness for the young Guru Gobind Singh, who, too, often came here to sit in the Queen's lap giving her immense delight and spiritual solace. She fed the Child Gobind and his playmates, at his demand, with boiled and salted gram. Even now boiled and salted gram is served as prasad (consecrated food) in this Gurdwara, which, unlike the other shrines in Patna Sahib, is served by Nirmala Sikhs. A wood carving on the old front door is dated  28 August 1668, but the hall housing the sanctum and other blocks of rooms in the inner compound have been reconstructed during recent decades.

See also 
Takht Sri Harmandir Sahib
Akal Takht
Takht Sri Keshgarh Sahib
Takht Sri Damdama Sahib
Takht Sri Hazur Sahib

References

External links
 Gurdwara Bal Lila Maini
 Sri Dasam Granth ,The Sri Dasam Granth Sahib website

Religious buildings and structures in Patna
Gurdwaras in Bihar
1668 establishments in Asia
17th-century gurdwaras